This is a list of Belgian television related events from 2011.

Events
12 February - Witloof Bay are selected to represent Belgium at the 2011 Eurovision Song Contest with their song "With Love Baby". They are selected to be the fifty-third Belgian Eurovision entry during Eurosong held at the Palais des Congrès in Liège.
20 May - Kevin Kayirangwa wins the fourth and final season of Idool

Debuts
25 November - The Voice van Vlaanderen (2011–present)
5 December - ROX (2011–present)

Television shows

1990s
Samson en Gert (1990–present)
Familie (1991–present)
Thuis (1995–present)

2000s
Mega Mindy (2006–present)
Sterren op de Dansvloer (2006–2013)

Ending this year
Idool (2003-2011)

See also
2011 in Belgium